The National Organization for Business and Engineering (also referred to as NOBE) is a national society uniting business, management, and engineering organizations from universities in the United States and Canada.

History 

NOBE originally began as SBME, The Society for Business & Management in Engineering. SBME was founded in 1998 at the University of Illinois at Urbana-Champaign by then Mechanical Engineering student, Alex Meyer. The organization was formed in order to bridge the gap between engineering and business in the academic environment, thereby helping students develop into prepared and effective business leaders as well as engineers. From the outset, SBME was intended to be an organization that would eventually expand to major universities with engineering programs.

Meyer recruited Cam Kennedy, Brent Schwoerer, and John Hebda to form SBME's first managing board. Upon Meyer's graduation, John Hebda became the organization's second president and was joined by an expanded board of directors selected by SBME's founding board. Alex Meyer continued to support the organization and the board and to serve as an occasional presenter. In 2001 he established the first SBME Student Scholarship sponsored by his then employer, Deloitte Consulting.

In 2006, the Society for Business and Management in Engineering (SBME) at the University of Illinois at Urbana-Champaign proposed to move forward with the initial goal of expanding the organization to other universities and take it to a national level to gain exposure and recognition, while providing an environment for students all over the nation who are interested in business and engineering. SBME contacted similar organizations at three other universities (Purdue University, University of Wisconsin, University of Michigan) with this idea and put in motion the transformation into the National Organization for Business and Engineering. In March 2007, representatives from each of these universities convened at the University of Illinois to formally launch the national organization and make the vision of a national presence a reality. Alex Meyer returned to Urbana to keynote at the event. In 2008, NOBE's first executive board of directors was formed with Andy Forti, Toni McEwan, Alex Meyer, and Matthew Price as its initial members.

Constitution

At the annual NOBE National Conference held in February 2010, all chapters ratified the NOBE Constitution, a process that has been underway for over a year.  Important issues, including national board elections, new chapter application, probation, and chapter structure, were debated and voted upon.  By the end of the conference, all chapters were in agreement with the Constitution, and it became the official governing document of the national organization.

National Executive Board

In addition to ratifying the official NOBE Constitution at the 2010 NOBE National Conference, the first national governing board was formed to continue growth and development of the national organization.  Elections were held for 5 positions.  Katy Hoover, from the University of Illinois at Urbana-Champaign chapter, was elected the first president of the national organization.  Other positions were filled by Adam Brunner (Vice President), Andrew Quinn (Finance Director), Kevin Daley (Secretary), and David Grochocki (Technology Director).

Events

The local chapters of National Organization for Business and Engineering keep holding events throughout years in and out campus to pursue the goal of bringing the business perspective to engineering and technology students. Local events include case studies with different companies, company info sessions, faculty speeches, lectures related to interviews and job hunting.

In addition to local chapter events, the National Organization for Business and Engineering holds national events each year.

One tradition is the National Conference. The National Organization for Business and Engineering has a three-day-long national conference each spring semester and the board members and general members from each chapter will go to a host school to attend the conference. The content of the conference includes annual summary of NOBE's operation, discussion panels, speeches of different topics, workshops related to what is going on in today's business and engineering society, the national election and a banquet. See below for a list of all historical National Conferences.

Other events held by the National Organization for Business and Engineering included a Stock Market Simulation Game. This is an online stock game with real stock market action, but virtual capital. Any member from NOBE can play this game and the competition is among all the chapters. The first three places of the game typically win prizes.

The National Organization for Business and Engineering also has case studies which prove to be very informative and gives students a chance to take part in actual case studies with reputed companies like Dow Chemicals and Caterpillar. They give you hands on experience about how to approach a problem and how to impromptu convince your customer about why he/she should buy your product. This makes these case studies all the more exciting and challenging. The case studies give a group of students a particular situation in which you are expected to sell your product to the customer where you are given the advantages and dis-advantages of a product and the students are supposed to crack the deal with the customer in a limited amount of time. The students are also awarded with the first, second and third prices to add another incentive and encourage them to participate.

Chapters

National Conferences

External links
National Organization for Business and Engineering National Website

Engineering societies based in the United States